The 2009 Sanremo Tennis Cup was a professional tennis tournament played on red clay courts. It was part of the 2009 ATP Challenger Tour. It took place in Sanremo, Italy between May 4 and May 10, 2009.

Singles entrants

Seeds

 Rankings are as of April 27, 2009.

Other entrants
The following players received wildcards into the singles main draw:
  Daniele Bracciali
  Thomas Fabbiano
  Enrico Fioravante
  Giancarlo Petrazzuolo

The following players received entry from the qualifying draw:
  Martín Alund
  Benjamin Balleret
  Daniele Giorgini
  Blaž Kavčič

The following players received special exempt into the singles main draw:
  Ivan Dodig
  Jan Hájek

Champions

Singles

 Kevin Anderson def.  Blaž Kavčič, 2–6, 6–2, 7–5.

Doubles

 Yuri Schukin /  Dmitri Sitak def.  Daniele Bracciali /  Giancarlo Petrazzuolo, 6–4, 7–6(4).

References
Official website
ITF search 
2009 Draws

Sanremo Tennis Cup
Sanremo Tennis Cup